Thalassolituus oleivorans is a species of bacteria, the type species of its genus. It is an aerobic, heterotrophic, Gram-negative, curved bacteria that metabolises aliphatic hydrocarbons, their oxidized derivatives and acetate, with type strain MIL-1T (=DSM 14913T =LMG 21420T).

References

Further reading

External links
LPSN
ScientificAmerican article
Type strain of Thalassolituus oleivorans at BacDive -  the Bacterial Diversity Metadatabase

Oceanospirillales
Bacteria described in 2004